In India, incense sticks, called Agarbatti (Agar: from Dravidian probably Tamil அகில் (agil), அகிர்(agir)., Sanskrit vatti, "wound" or "grief" ),) are a large part of the economy and many religions in the region.

The basic ingredients of an incense stick are bamboo sticks, paste (generally made of charcoal dust or sawdust and joss/ jiggit/ gum/ tabu powder – an adhesive made from the bark of Bollywood litsea glutinosa and other trees), and the perfume ingredients – which traditionally would be a masala (powder of ground ingredients), though more commonly is a solvent of perfumes and/ or essential oils. After the base paste has been applied to the bamboo stick, it is either, in the traditional method, while still moist, immediately rolled into the masala, or, more commonly, left for several days to dry, and then dipped into the scented solvent.

Various resins, such as amber, myrrh, frankincense, and resin of the halmaddi tree are used in traditional masala incense, usually as a fragrant binding ingredient, and these add their distinctive fragrance to the finished incense. Some resins, such as gum arabic, may be used where it is desirable for the binding agent to have no fragrance of its own. Halmaddi has a particular interest to some consumers, possibly through its association with the popular Satya Nag Champa. It is an earth colored liquid resin drawn from the Ailanthus triphysa tree; as with other resins, it is a viscous semi-liquid when fresh, it hardens to a brittle solid as it evaporates and ages. Some incense makers mix it with honey in order to keep it pliable. Due to crude extraction methods which resulted in trees dying, by the 1990s the Forest Department in India had banned resin extraction; This forced up the price of halmaddi, so its usage in incense making declined. In 2011, extraction was allowed under leasing agreements, which increased in 2013, though production is still limited for the resin to sometimes be stolen via improper extraction to be sold on the black market.

The oldest written source on incense is the Vedas, specifically, the Atharva-veda and the Rigveda, which set out and encouraged a uniform method of making incense. Although Vedic texts mention the use of incense for masking odors and creating a pleasurable smell, the modern system of organized incense-making was likely created by the medicinal priests of the time. Thus, modern, organized incense-making is intrinsically linked to the Ayurvedic medical system in which it is rooted. The method of incense making with a bamboo stick as a core originated in India at the end of the 19th century, largely replacing the rolled, extruded or shaped method which is still used in India for dhoop and cones, and for most shapes of incense in Nepal, Tibet and Japan. Other main forms of incense are cones and logs and benzoin resin (or Sambrani), which are incense paste formed into pyramid shapes or log shapes, and then dried.

Ingredients 

The basic ingredients of an incense stick are bamboo sticks, paste  (generally made of charcoal powder or wood powder and joss/jiggit/gum/tabu powder – an adhesive made from the bark of litsea glutinosa and other trees), and the perfume ingredients – which traditionally would be a powder of mixed ground ingredients, though more commonly is a solvent of perfumes and/or essential oils. After the base paste has been applied to the bamboo stick, it is either, in the traditional method, while still moist, immediately rolled into the flavourant, or, more commonly, left in the sun for several days to dry, and then dipped into the scented solvent.

Many Indian incense makers follow Ayurvedic principles, in which the ingredients that go into incense-making are categorized into five classes: ether (fruits), for example star anise; water (stems and branches), for example sandalwood, aloeswood, cedar wood, cassia, frankincense, myrrh, and borneol; earth (roots), for example turmeric, vetiver, ginger, costus root, valerian, Indian spikenard; fire (flowers), for example clove; and air (leaves), for example patchouli.

Halmaddi is a fragrant binding ingredient which is used in traditional masala incense. It is an earth coloured liquid resin drawn from the Ailanthus triphysa tree; as with other resins, it is a viscous semi-liquid when fresh, it hardens to a brittle solid as it evaporates and ages. Some incense makers mix it with honey in order to keep it pliable. Due to crude extraction methods which resulted in trees dying, by the 1990s the Forest Department in India had banned resin extraction; this forced up the price of halmaddi, so its usage in incense making declined. In 2011, extraction was allowed under leasing agreements, which increased in 2013, though production is still sufficiently limited for the resin to sometimes be stolen via improper extraction to be sold on the black market. Other tree resins or gums are also used as a binding agent, such as amber, myrrh, and frankincense, and these will add their distinctive fragrance to the finished incense; some resins, such as gum arabic, may be used where it is desirable for the binding agent to have no fragrance of its own.

History 

The practice of incense as a healing tool was assimilated into the religious practices of the time. As Hinduism matured and Buddhism was founded in India, incense became an integral part of Buddhism as well. Around 200 CE, a group of wandering Buddhist monks introduced incense stick making to China. Some incense, depending on the contents, may also act as organic insect repellent.

Hinduism 

In Hinduism, agarbatti is an integral part of most rituals. The name is derived from agarwood which is commonly used in incense production.

The oldest source on incense is the Vedas, specifically, the Atharva-veda and the Rigveda. Incense-burning was used both to create pleasing aromas and a medicinal tool. Its use in medicine is considered the first phase of Ayurveda, which uses incense as an approach to healing. Incense-making was thus almost exclusively done by monks.

Incense remains an important part of the daily puja ritual, which is a religious offering performed by all Hindus to their deities, especially during the beginning of a new venture, or to commemorate some special occasion. The aspect of the ritual is known as dhupa and involves the offering of incense before the picture of a deity, as a token of respect. An incense stick is lit to introduce pleasant fragrances and to cleanse the air of negative energy. The ashes of the burning agarbatti collected symbolize the sacrifice of one's self to others.

A sādhu will regularly burn incense in this fashion, as a gesture to Agni, the God of Fire, to ward away unseen forces that must be continually propitiated with offerings and cleansing rituals. Their sacred fireplaces, known as dhuni, perform the same function as incense, on a larger scale, which is to transform matter into aether. Burning incense is thus a reminder, of the sacred power of fire to transform, and the ultimate journey of all physical matter towards spirit.

Production
Production may be partly or completely by hand, or partly or completely by machine. There are semi-automatic machine for applying paste, semi-automatic machine for perfume-dipping, semi-automatic machine for packing, or fully automated machines which apply paste and scent, though the bulk of production is done by hand-rolling at home. There are about 5,000 incense companies in India which take raw un-perfumed sticks hand-rolled by approximately 200,000 women working part-time at home, apply their own brand of perfume, and package the sticks for sale. An experienced home-worker can produce 4,000 raw sticks a day. There are about 25 main companies, who together account for up to 30% of the market, and around 500 of the companies, including a significant number of the main companies, are based in Bangalore. 
The state of Karnataka, referred to as the Capital of Agarbathi (Incense Sticks), is the leading producer of the agarbathi in India, with Mysore and Bangalore being the main manufacturing centres of scented agarbatti and Gaya, Bihar was the manufacturing hub of unscented agarbatti. The Mysore region is recognised as a pioneer in the activity of agarbathi manufacturing and this is one of the main cluster activities that exist in the city. In recent years, growth in the production of agarbathi (incense sticks), Dhoop-Deep has been seen in every part of India. There are plenty of manufacturers in Maharashtra,Gaya and Gujrat and the western India agarbatti market is totally dominated by them. At a national level, the most prominent manufacturers include N. Ranga Rao & Sons with their Cycle Pure Agarbathies, PremaNature with their Natural Vedic Incense Sticks, Patanjali with their Aastha agarbatti, Samun Agarbatti with their gaya darshan and ITC with their Mangaldeep.

Economy

India is one of the world's top incense producing countries,. It was the largest exporter of incense until 2015, after several years of reduced import tariffs as a result of the ASEAN-India Free Trade Agreement. Subsequently, the Indian Ministry of Commerce and Industry (India) increased tariffs on incense imports in 2019 and 2020.

Under the aegis of the "Atma Nirbhar Bharat Abhiyan", the government of India approved an incense production and employment program on August 2, 2020. The program is called "Khadi Agarbatti Atma Nirbhar Mission", and was proposed by the Khadi Village Industries Commission (KVIC) of India. Under this scheme, the incense artisans will be provided automatic agarbatti and powder-mixing machines through private business partners. One quarter of the cost of each unit will be borne by KVIC via a subsidy, while the remnant will be paid through loans by the artisans.

Dhoop

Dhoop is a type of extruded incense, lacking a core bamboo stick. Many dhoops have very concentrated scents and emit a lot of smoke when burned. Well known is Chandan Dhoop, a formulation containing a high percentage of sandalwood. In South India dhoop is also referred to as sambrani as it often also contains high proportions of benzoin resin such as used in PremaNature Vedic Dhoop.

See also

Related concepts
 Añjali Mudrā
 Buddhist prayer beads
 Coconut: use for worship
 Culture of India
 Dhupa
 Hindu prayer beads
 Hindu temple
 Jain festivals
 List of Hindu festivals
 Mala
 Mudras
 Namaste
 Pādodaka
 Pranāma
 Puja (Buddhism)
 Puja (Hinduism)
 The Archaeology of Hindu Ritual

Others
 Guru-shishya tradition
 Lists of festivals
 Religious festival

References 

 
India
Indian culture